Freeport-McMoRan Center (formerly One Central Park East) is a highrise located in Downtown Phoenix, Arizona. It is located adjacent to Arizona State University's Downtown campus. Upon completion in 2009, the building was the first high-rise office tower to open in Downtown Phoenix in nearly eight years.  It is named for mining company Freeport-McMoRan whose headquarters are located in the building.

History
The tower was originally designed as a multi-use complex made up of the office tower with high-rise condominiums and academic space for the Arizona State University Downtown Phoenix campus. The plan was modified in 2006 because of money constraints and ASU's tight timetable to open the School of Journalism building by August 2008.

The project's demise forced developers to redesign the project so they could move forward on the most-needed component, the office tower, while still leaving room on the site to develop ASU space and residential housing, should either be needed in the future.

On January 27, 2009, the developers of the tower held a "topping out" ceremony celebrating that construction has reached its highest point.

In May 2010, plans were revealed to fill the first eight usable floors of the tower with a 242-room luxury Westin Hotel.  On March 10, 2011 the new hotel was opened to guests.  The $40 million hotel was designed and built out in less than a year in order to get it open as soon as possible.  Building modification included a two-story addition on the west side of the building to accommodate a private hotel entrance, restaurant and a pool on the second floor.  The original lobby was reconfigured and the elevators for the hotel were partitioned off to keep the office and hotel uses separate.

Building Design
The building has ground floor retail, nine floors of above ground parking, eight floors dedicated to a Westin hotel and the uppermost eight floors with Class A office space, filled by namesake Freeport-McMoRan Copper & Gold. The glass windows are adorned with vertical and horizontal “fins” that limit the amount of sunlight entering the building during the day while still allowing clear views.

See also
 List of tallest buildings in Arizona

References

External links
Skyscraper Center

Skyscraper office buildings in Phoenix, Arizona
Skyscraper hotels in Phoenix, Arizona
Office buildings completed in 2009